Stanton E. Samenow (born October 16, 1941) is an American psychologist and writer.

Biography

Early life and education
Samenow was born to Charles and Sylvia Samenow. He is married, has two children, and resides in Falls Church, Virginia.

Career
From 1970 through 1978, Dr. Samenow worked as a clinical research psychologist for the Program for the Investigation of Criminal Behavior at St. Elizabeth's Hospital in Washington, D.C.. With Dr. Samuel Yochelson, the findings of their clinical research-treatment study of offenders were published in the three-volume set entitled The Criminal Personality. Since 1978, Dr. Samenow has been in private practice as a clinical psychologist in Alexandria, Virginia.

Dr. Stanton Samenow received his B.A. (cum laude) from Yale University in 1963 and his PhD in psychology from the University of Michigan in 1968.  In 1978, Dr. Samenow entered the private practice of clinical psychology in Alexandria, Virginia. His specialty has continued to be the evaluation and treatment of juvenile and adult offenders. Dr. Samenow has delivered lectures, training seminars, and workshops in 48 states, Canada, and England, to professional groups including mental health, law enforcement, corrections, education, social services, and the judiciary.

Dr. Samenow frequently carries out psychological reports for use in family court cases in the USA. Dr. Samenow wrote a book based on his experience as an independent custody evaluator published in 2002. It is titled "In the Best Interest of the Child: How to Protect Your Child from the Pain of Your Divorce".

Published works

Books
The Criminal Personality, Volumes I, II & III (1976, 1977, 1986)
Inside the Criminal Mind (1984)
Before It's Too Late (1989)
Straight Talk About Criminals (1998)
In the Best Interest of the Child (2002)
Inside the Criminal Mind: Revised and Updated Edition (2004)
The Myth of the Out of Character Crime (2007)

Articles
Understanding the User (unknown date) appeared in Virginia Lawyer.

Videos
Good Intentions, Bad Choices: Overcoming Errors in Thinking
Commitment To Change I: Overcoming Errors in Thinking
Commitment to Change II: Tactics—Habits That Block Change
Commitment to Change III: The Power of Consequences

References

External links
Stanton E. Samenow, Ph.D.
CCJP.com, The Institute for Addiction and Criminal Justice Studies

1941 births
Living people
21st-century American psychologists
American psychology writers
American male non-fiction writers
Forensic psychologists
University of Michigan alumni
Yale University alumni
20th-century American psychologists